Blichfeldt's theorem is a mathematical theorem in the geometry of numbers, stating that whenever a bounded set in the Euclidean plane has area , it can be translated so that it includes at least  points of the integer lattice. Equivalently, every bounded set of area  contains a set of  points whose coordinates all differ by integers.

This theorem can be generalized to other lattices and to higher dimensions, and can be interpreted as a continuous version of the pigeonhole principle. It is named after Danish-American mathematician Hans Frederick Blichfeldt, who published it in 1914. Some sources call it Blichfeldt's principle or Blichfeldt's lemma.

Statement and proof
The theorem can be stated most simply for points in the Euclidean plane, and for the integer lattice in the plane. For this version of the theorem, let  be any measurable set, let  denote its area, and round this number up to the next integer value, . Then Blichfeldt's theorem states that  can be translated so that its translated copy contains at least  points with integer coordinates.

The basic idea of the proof is to cut  into pieces according to the squares of the integer lattice, and to translate each of those pieces by an integer amount so that it lies within the unit square having the origin as its lower right corner. Therefore, some point  of the unit square must be covered with multiplicity at least . A translation that takes  to the origin will also take all of the  points of  that covered  to integer points, which is what was required.

More generally, the theorem applies to -dimensional sets , with -dimensional volume , and to an arbitrary -dimensional lattice  (a set of points in -dimensional space that do not all lie in any lower dimensional subspace, are separated from each other by some minimum distance, and can be combined by adding or subtracting their coordinates to produce other points in the same set). Just as the integer lattice divides the plane into squares, an arbitrary lattice divides its space into fundamental regions (called parallelotopes) with the property that any one of these regions can be translated onto any other of them by adding the coordinates of a unique lattice point. The proof is as before: cut up  by parallelotopes, translate the pieces by translation vectors in  onto a single parallelotope without changing the total volume (counted with multiplicity), observe that there must be a point  of multiplicity at least , and use a translation that takes  to the origin.

Instead of asking for a translation for which there are  lattice points, an equivalent form of the theorem states that  itself contains a set of  points, all of whose pairwise differences belong to the lattice. A strengthened version of the theorem applies to compact sets, and states that they can be translated to contain at least  points of the lattice. This number of points differs from  only when  is an integer, for which it is larger by one.

Applications

Minkowski's theorem
Minkowski's theorem, proved earlier than Blichfeldt's work by Hermann Minkowski, states that any convex set in the plane that is centrally symmetric around the origin, with area greater than four (or a compact symmetric set with area equal to four) contains a nonzero integer point. More generally, for a -dimensional lattice  whose fundamental parallelotopes have volume , any set centrally symmetric around the origin with volume greater than  contains a nonzero lattice point.

Although Minkowski's original proof was different, Blichfeldt's theorem can be used in a simple proof of Minkowski's theorem.

Other applications

Many applications of Blichfeldt's theorem, like the application to Minkowski's theorem, involve finding a nonzero lattice point in a large-enough set, but one that is not convex. When this is the case, the larger size of  relative to  leads to tighter bounds on how big  needs to be sure of containing a lattice point.

Applications of this method include simultaneous Diophantine approximation, the problem of approximating a given set of irrational numbers by rational numbers that all have the same denominators.

Generalizations
Analogues of Blichfeldt's theorem have been proven for other sets of points than lattices, showing that large enough regions contain many points from these sets. These include a theorem for Fuchsian groups, lattice-like subsets of  matrices, and for the sets of vertices of Archimedean tilings.

Other generalizations allow the set  to be a measurable function, proving that its sum over some set of translated lattice points is at least as large as its integral, or replace the single set  with a family of sets.

Computational complexity
A computational problem related to Blichfeldt's theorem has been shown to be complete for the PPP complexity class, and therefore unlikely to be solvable in polynomial time. The computational hardness of this task motivates the construction of a candidate for a collision-resistant cryptographic hash function.

See also
Dot planimeter, a device for estimating the area of a shape by counting the lattice points that it contains
Pick's theorem, a more precise relationship between area and lattice points covered by a polygon with lattice-point vertices

References

External links

Geometry of numbers
Theorems in geometry